"Visitors" is a 1985 song recorded by Italian group Koto. Composed by Maiola and produced by Cundari, it is considered one of the best songs in the Italo disco canon. It contains a sample from Michael Jackson's 1984 hit, "Thriller". It is also considered one of the first "spacesynth" songs, a style of music which became popular during the mid-late 80s.

'Visitors' has sold 200,000 units, making it one of the highest selling Italo disco songs.

Track listings

Original 12" single 
1. Visitors (6:12)
2. Visitors (Alien Mix) (6:12)

Original 7" single 
1. Visitors (3:55)
2. Visitors (Alien Mix) (3:40)

New version '86 12" 
1. Visitors (New Version '86) (6:40)
2. Visitors (Alien Mix) (6:12)

New version '86 7" 
1. Visitors (New Version '86) (3:40)
2. Visitors (Alien Mix) (3:40)

Vocal Mix 12" 
1. Visitors (Vocal Mix) (6:20)^
2. Visitors (Alien Mix) (6:12)
 *remixed by Fredrik Ramel
 ^remixed by Tess

1985 singles
1985 songs
Koto (band) songs